"Higher Ground" is a funk song written by Stevie Wonder which first appeared on his 1973 album Innervisions. The song reached number 4 on the Billboard Hot 100 and number 1 on the US Hot R&B Singles chart. Wonder wrote and recorded the song in a three-hour burst of creativity in May 1973. The album version of the song contains an extra verse and runs 30 seconds longer than the single version. The unique wah-wah clavinet sound in the song was achieved with a Mu-Tron III envelope filter pedal. The bass line is provided by a Moog synthesizer and using overdubs, Wonder played all instruments on the track, including drums and percussion.

The song was released in the UK but achieved only modest success, reaching number 29 in the UK Singles Chart.

Subject
The song lyrics address the issue of reincarnation. Wonder commented, when interviewed by The New York Times:
I would like to believe in reincarnation. I would like to believe that there is another life. I think that sometimes your consciousness can happen on this earth a second time around. For me, I wrote "Higher Ground" even before the accident. But something must have been telling me that something was going to happen to make me aware of a lot of things and to get myself together. This is like my second chance for life, to do something or to do more, and to value the fact that I am alive.

According to Billboard, the lyrics are about "people who are moving ahead in love and in all phases of life."

Critical reception
In its contemporary review, Cash Box said the song "is further evidence of [Wonder's] inner genius."

In 2004, Rolling Stone ranked the song number 261 on its list of the 500 Greatest Songs of All Time, was re-ranked at number 265 in 2010, and re-ranked at number 113 in 2021, adding: "'Higher Ground' was recorded just before Wonder was involved in a near-fatal accident in August 1973 that left him in a coma. Early in Wonder's recovery, his road manager sang the song's melody into the singer's ear; Wonder responded by moving his fingers with the music." According to Acclaimed Music, it is the 575th most celebrated song in popular music history.

Charts

Weekly charts

Year-end charts

Certifications

Red Hot Chili Peppers version

The funk rock band Red Hot Chili Peppers released a cover as the first single from their fourth studio album Mother's Milk.

It has been featured in films, TV shows and video games, including Mighty Morphin Power Rangers: The Movie, Beavis and Butthead, Center Stage, The Fresh Prince of Bel-Air, Walking Tall, The Longest Yard, The Karate Kid, The Change-Up, Rocksmith and Guitar Hero Live.

A remixed version by the X-Ecutioners was featured in the video game SSX 3 while a cover version appeared in Guitar Hero.

FX used the song to promote The Ultimate Fighter: Live and it also serves as the show's theme song.

As part of the "Year of a Million Dreams" Celebration, Space Mountain at Disneyland in Anaheim, California was transformed into Rockin' Space Mountain. The song was used as its soundtrack for 16 weeks, from January 3, 2007, to April 26, 2007.

In 2000 British magazine Total Guitar named it the second greatest cover ever.

Red Hot Chili Peppers performed the song with other musicians as part of the all-star jam during the band's induction into the 2012 Rock and Roll Hall of Fame Induction Ceremony.

The music video for this version was directed by Drew Carolan and Bill Stobaugh, and was nominated for Breakthrough Video at the 1990 MTV Video Music Awards.

Track listing

US Cassette single (1989)
"Higher Ground"
"Nobody Weird Like Me"

7" single (1989)
"Higher Ground"
"Fight Like a Brave"

UK CD single
"Higher Ground"
"Higher Ground" (Munchkin Mix)
"Millionaires Against Hunger"
"Mommy Where's Daddy?"

12" UK promo (1989)
"Higher Ground"
"Higher Ground" (Munchkin Mix)
"Higher Ground" (Bert Bevans Remix)

12" US promo (1989)
"Higher Ground" (12" Vocal)
"Higher Ground" (Politician Mix)
"Higher Ground" (Dub Mix)

Australian 7" single (1989) [US-2346] EMI USA
"Higher Ground" - 3:12
"Punk Rock Classic" - 1:37

UK 7" single (1989)
"Higher Ground"
"Millionaires Against Hunger"

UK 12" 3D Punch Out Pepper single (1990)
"Higher Ground"
"Higher Ground" (Munchkin Mix)
"Politician" (Mini Rap)
"Higher Ground" (Bert Bevans Mix)

UK 12" gatefold sleeve pop up single (1990)
"Higher Ground"
"Fight Like a Brave"
"Out in L.A."

UK 12" limited edition picture disc single (1990)
"Higher Ground"
"Higher Ground" (Daddy-O Mix)
"Fight Like a Brave"

UK CD Reissue-single (1990) [#CDMT-88] EMI USA
"Higher Ground" (album) - 3:22
"Fight Like a Brave" (album) - 3:47
"Behind the Sun" (album) - 4:40
"Out in L.A." (album) - 1:58

France CD promo single (1992) [#SPCD1608] EMI France
"Higher Ground" (Daddy-O Mix) - 5:15
"Millionaires Against Hunger" - 3:11
"Castles" (Live) - 3:17

Personnel
Red Hot Chili Peppers
 Anthony Kiedis – lead vocals
 John Frusciante – guitar, talk box, backing vocals
 Flea – bass, backing vocals
 Chad Smith – drums, tambourine

Additional personnel

 Vicki Calhoun – backing vocals 
 Wag – backing vocals
 Randy Ruff – backing vocals
 Aklia Chinn – backing vocals 
 Jack Sherman – backing vocals 
 Joel Virgel Viergel – backing vocals 
 Iris Parker – backing vocals 
 Julie Ritter – backing vocals 
 Gretchen Seager – backing vocals 
 Laure Spinosa – backing vocals 
 Sir Babs – backing vocals 
 Merill Ward – backing vocals 
 Bruno Deron – backing vocals 
 Kristen Vigard – backing vocals

Chart performance

References

1973 singles
1973 songs
1989 singles
Cashbox number-one singles
EMI America Records singles
Etta James songs
Funk songs
Motown singles
Red Hot Chili Peppers songs
Songs written by Stevie Wonder
Stevie Wonder songs
Tamla Records singles
Song recordings produced by Stevie Wonder